Dichrorampha simpliciana is a moth of the family Tortricidae. It is found in Europe and the Near East.

The wingspan is 12–16 mm.The forewings are considerably dilated posteriorly and the fold reaches 2/5. The ground colour is dark fuscous, irrorated with pale ochreous. The costa is posteriorly obscurely streaked with dull purplish-metallic. There is a paler triangular straight edged median dorsal blotch, darker-margined anteriorly and three minute indistinct black dots on the termen towards middle, and sometimes a whitish subapical dash. The termen is rounded, little oblique, sinuation well-marked.The hindwings are fuscous, darker posteriorly.The larva isdull whitish ; head light brown ; plate of 2 faintly brownish

The moth flies from May to September..

The larvae feed on Artemisia vulgaris.

Notes
The flight season refers to Belgium and the Netherlands. This may vary in other parts of the range.

References

External links
 Lepidoptera of Belgium
 Dichrorampha simpliciana at UKmoths

Tortricidae of Europe